Long Jiguang (龍濟光) (1867–1925) was an ethnic Hani Chinese general of the late Qing and early Republican period of China.

Biography
Long's older brother Jinguang (龍覲光) was also a general. Long began his military career suppressing anti-Qing rebellion by Republican revolutionaries in China. After the fall of the Qing, he supported Yuan Shikai against Sun Yat-sen. After Yuan created the Empire of China, Long fought against the Guangxi warlords Lu Rongting and Li Liejun, who opposed Yuan's restoration of the monarchy. An opponent of the Constitutional Protection Movement, Long fled southern China to Beijing, where he supported Duan Qirui and the Anhui clique until their defeat in the Zhili–Anhui War. Long died in Beijing on the same day as Sun Yat-sen.

Ye Ju was one of his lieutenants.

External links

Hani people
1867 births
1925 deaths
Qing dynasty generals
Republic of China warlords from Yunnan
People from Honghe
Empire of China (1915–1916)